Craig Robert Nicholls (born 31 August 1977) is an Australian musician, best known as the lead singer, songwriter, and guitarist of the Australian alternative rock band The Vines, of which he is the sole continuous member.

Early life
Nicholls was born in Sydney. Terry Nicholls, his father, was the guitarist and vocalist in a 1960s group named The Vynes. He later worked as an accountant for Sony Music Australia. Nicholls has an older brother, Matt, an older sister, Tara, who is a solicitor, and a younger sister, Jessica. Nicholls' father taught him to play guitar during childhood. He spent his free time listening to The Beatles, painting artworks, and skateboarding. He stated, "I grew up a loner... I never socialised. I stayed at home and listened to music all day. Music became a mystical world."

Nicholls attended Marist College Penshurst until he dropped out of high school at the 10th grade. He then enrolled in an art school for six months to study painting. He supported his ambition to become a musician by working at a McDonald's in Hurstville. There, he met future bandmates: bass guitarist Patrick Matthews and drummer David Oliffe. To form a quartet named Rishikesh, Nicholls also invited his schoolmate Ryan Griffiths to join on playing the guitar. Nicholls chose the band's name, Rishikesh, which originally referred to a city in India where The Beatles had attended an ashram. Reviewing early gigs, newspapers would misprint the name as "Rishi Chasms", so Nicholls decided to change it to The Vines, as a reference to his father's group.

Music career

Nicholls had never written songs until The Vines started playing gigs. Early performances included playing for backyard parties and a regular spot on a local radio station. They gathered a following in Sydney and eventually garnered the notice of Capitol Records. Once he started writing songs, he loved it and continued to write more; the writing was a good outlet for him. Nicholls wrote "Factory", the band's first single, which became NME Single of the Week in November 2001. At the ARIA Music Awards of 2002, The Vines won 'Best Breakthrough Artist - Single' for "Get Free", which was also written by Nicholls. At the APRA Awards of 2003 he won the 'Breakthrough Songwriter Award'.

Griffiths, Heald and Rosser eventually quit from their roles in the band, and Nicholls returned with new band members for the release of the Vines' independently released sixth album Wicked Nature, described as a "comeback" by Darren Levin of the Faster Louder online music publication. Nicholls also produced the album that was recorded with Tim John (bass) and Lachy West (drums) of the band The Griswolds. Regarding the departure of his former bandmates, Nicholls explained in August 2014, "It's not the most comfortable thing [to talk about]... it's just a shame that it didn't work out."

Several of Nicholls' paintings are used for Vines releases, including for the albums Highly Evolved, Winning Days (self portrait only), and singles "Highly Evolved", and "Outtathaway!". Nicholls' work on Highly Evolved was nominated for "Best Cover Art" at the 2002 ARIA Awards.

Personal life

By 2002, Nicholls had gained a reputation as an erratic performer. In August, The Vines performed "Get Free" on Late Show with David Letterman, with Nicholls trashing Hamish Rosser's drum kit. In December, they were prevented from performing on The Tonight Show with Jay Leno after Nicholls damaged the set during a rehearsal. His behaviour was seen as "a sign of stress and mental exhaustion".

In May 2004, The Vines appeared at a promotional show for Triple M radio, where Nicholls bleated at the audience and demanded they not talk during the band's performance. When he heard a laugh, he said to the crowd, "Why the fuck are you laughing? You're all a bunch of sheep. Can you go baa?" An official photographer, Janie Barrett, snapped a picture of Nicholls, who allegedly kicked out at her, smashing her camera. As a result, Matthews left the stage and quit on the spot, later joining Youth Group. He would not perform with The Vines again for another 14 years. Triple M subsequently banned the group's music from being broadcast by their station. Further performances on their Australian, United States, and European tours to promote their second album, Winning Days, were cancelled.

In November 2004, accompanied by his brother Matt and his manager and friend Andy Kelly, Nicholls faced assault and malicious damage charges at Balmain Local Court in Sydney. During the ten-minute hearing, it was revealed that Nicholls has Asperger Syndrome. His condition had been suspected by road crew veteran Tony Bateman, who felt there was something clinically different with Nicholls and downloaded information about Asperger Syndrome, which he handed over to Kelly. Professor Tony Attwood, an autism spectrum disorders specialist, confirmed the diagnosis after seeing Nicholls and his family in August. The judge dropped all charges against Nicholls on the condition that he seek immediate treatment. Nicholls yelled "I'm free!" upon leaving the courthouse. He was under medical treatment and therapy for six months, and stopped his intake of fast food and cannabis. He spoke about his condition in subsequent interviews.

In November 2008, The Vines cancelled shows in Australia and Japan, as Nicholls' mental health had deteriorated over the previous month, and he required further help. Nicholls was arrested on 13 October 2012 at his Sydney home on allegations he had assaulted his parents, and injured a responding police officer as he resisted arrest. He appeared before a judge at Sutherland Local Court on 17 October 2012, where a trial date of 14 November was set. The charges include "two counts of domestic assault, assault occasioning actual bodily harm, stalking and resisting arrest".

In a 2014 Rolling Stone Australia article, Nicholls revealed that he had moved back into the family home in 2013 after receiving "medical intervention". On the subject of his mental health, he said:

In an August 2014 interview with the DIY publication, Nicholls explained that he manages his condition by rarely socialising, stating, "I'm just following my instincts so... that's alright." During the same interview, he also revealed that he shuns 21st-century technology, such as smartphones and computers, as he prefers to minimise his responsibilities to live "like a kid". Nicholls maintained that music has "really been the thing that saved me".

References

External links

1977 births
20th-century guitarists
20th-century Australian male singers
21st-century guitarists
21st-century Australian male singers
Alternative rock guitarists
Alternative rock singers
APRA Award winners
Australian alternative rock musicians
Australian male guitarists
Australian male singer-songwriters
Australian painters
Australian rock guitarists
Australian rock singers
Lead guitarists
Living people
Musicians with disabilities
People with Asperger syndrome
Singers from Sydney
The Vines (band) members